Clearbrook is a gated community and census-designated place (CDP) in Monroe Township, Middlesex County, New Jersey, United States. It is in the western part of the township, bordered to the north by Encore at Monroe and to the east by Concordia and The Ponds.

The CDP was named Clearbrook Park in the 2000 and 2010 censuses and renamed in 2020. As of the 2010 United States Census, the CDP's population was 2,667.

Geography 
According to the United States Census Bureau, as of 2010 the Clearbrook Park CDP had a total area of 0.885 square miles (2.291 km2), including 0.874 square miles (2.264 km2) of land and 0.011 square miles (0.027 km2) of water (1.20%).

Demographics

Census 2010

Census 2000 
According to the 2000 United States Census there were 3,053 people, 1,947 households, and 1,006 families living in the CDP. The population density was 1,386.8/km2 (3,584.9/mi2). There were 2,067 housing units at an average density of 938.9/km2 (2,427.1/mi2). The racial makeup of the CDP was 98.56% White, 0.82% African American, 0.29% Asian, and 0.33% from two or more races. Hispanic or Latino of any race were 0.69% of the population.

There were 1,947 households, out of which 0.5% had children under the age of 18 living with them, 49.2% were married couples living together, 2.2% had a female householder with no husband present, and 48.3% were non-families. 46.2% of all households were made up of individuals, and 44.1% had someone living alone who was 65 years of age or older. The average household size was 1.57 and the average family size was 2.06.

In the CDP the population was spread out, with 0.8% under the age of 18, 0.1% from 18 to 24, 1.1% from 25 to 44, 7.6% from 45 to 64, and 90.4% who were 65 years of age or older. The median age was 76 years. For every 100 females, there were 66.2 males. For every 100 females age 18 and over, there were 66.1 males.

The median income for a household in the CDP was $36,506, and the median income for a family was $49,228. Males had a median income of $36,429 versus $49,375 for females. The per capita income for the CDP was $29,688. None of the families and 2.2% of the population were living below the poverty line, including no under eighteens and 2.2% of those over 64.

References 

Census-designated places in Middlesex County, New Jersey
Census-designated places in New Jersey
Monroe Township, Middlesex County, New Jersey